Airshow is a documentary TV show that follows a group of airshow pilots and performers across Canada and the United States. The show focuses on the hardships of preparing for and performing in air shows.

On June 1, 2015, four additional episodes began airing.

History

The show debuted on the Discovery Channel on January 26, 2015 in Canada. Filmed during the 2013 and 2014 seasons, crashes, mechanical problems, and tornadic weather hamper the pilots' and performers' ability to take to the sky.

Episodes

References

External links

 Great Pacific Television, Airshow (production website)
 Discovery Channel Canada, Airshow (original network website)

Discovery Channel (Canada) original programming
Documentary television series about aviation
2010s Canadian documentary television series
2015 Canadian television series debuts
2015 Canadian television series endings